The Bernalillo County Metropolitan Court is the Judicial system of the metropolitan areas of Albuquerque, New Mexico and Bernalillo County, New Mexico, USA. The Metropolitan Courthouse is located in Downtown Albuquerque.

System

The Metropolitan Court system was established in 1980, all judges are elected by eligible voters in Bernalillo County. Judges hold 4 year terms, in 19 divisions. There are no term limits in the court system and elections are partisan.

Requirements
To be eligible for an office of the Metropolitan Court, a candidate must be a member of the New Mexico Bar and have practiced law in New Mexico for approximately three years.

Judges
{|class="wikitable sortable"
!Division
!Name
!Party
!Took office
|- 
| 1|| Victor E. Valdez ||Democrat || 2004
|- 
| 2|| Christine Rodriguez ||Democrat || 2017
|- 
| 3|| Renee Torres ||Democrat || 2017
|- 
| 4||Courtney Weaks||Democrat || 2015
|- 
|5 || Frank A. Sedillo ||Democrat || 2008
|- 
|6 || Maria I. Dominguez ||Democrat || 2008
|- 
|7 || Rosemary Cosgrove-Aguilar ||Democrat || 2014
|- 
| 8|| Jill Martinez||Democrat || 2015
|- 
|9 || Yvette K. Gonzales ||Democrat || 2010
|- 
| 10|| Brittany Maldonado Malott ||Democrat || 2019
|- 
| 11 || Sandra  Engle || Democrat || 2006
|- 
| 12|| Jason Jaramillo ||Democrat || 2019
|- 
| 13 || Michelle Castillo–Dowler || Republican || 2013
|- 
| 14|| Vidalia G. Chavez||Democrat || 2014
|- 
| 15|| Felicia Blea-Rivera ||Democrat || 2019
|- 
| 16|| David A. Murphy ||Democrat || 2019
|- 
| 17 || Henry A. Alaniz || Republican || 2011
|- 
| 18 || Rosie Lazcano–Allred || Democrat ||  2005
|- 
| 19 || Linda S. Rogers || Democrat || 2006

Metropolitan Detention Center
Persons being held for trial at the Metropolitan Court, or convicted of misdemeanors and serving sentences under 12 months, are incarcerated in the county jail facility, the Metropolitan Detention Center (MDC), about 10 miles west of Albuquerque, on a rural mesa.  The  campus employs around 500 staff, and houses over 2,000 inmates.  Construction was completed in 2002, to replace the overcrowded, in-town county jail near the courthouse.  It is the county’s largest public facility, and single greatest consumer of electricity, using, for example, 12,627,000 kilowatts in 2012, at a cost of $981,563.  Use of solar power at the facility has increased, and as of January 2014, 20% of its power was provided by a 1-megawatt system of photovoltaic panels.

References

External links
City of Albuquerque – Metro Court Information
Bernalillo County Metropolitan Court website

Buildings and structures in Bernalillo County, New Mexico
Organizations based in Albuquerque, New Mexico
Bernalillo County, New Mexico
New Mexico state courts
1980 establishments in New Mexico
Courts and tribunals established in 1980